Irish Life Assurance plc, commonly known as Irish Life, is an Irish life assurance and pensions company. Irish Life has been part of the Great-West Lifeco group of companies since 2013, when the Irish Government sold the business. Prior to 2012, Irish Life was part of Permanent TSB.

History
The Irish Life assurance company was created in 1939 with state assistance and concentrated on life assurance and investment products. By 1936, as a result of the Great Depression, many life assurance companies were technically insolvent. The four which merged to form Irish Life (and their dates of incorporation) were the City of Dublin Assurance (1925); Irish Life and General Assurance (1923); Irish National Assurance (1919); and Munster and Leinster Assurance (1929). Later, some British companies shed their Irish operations and merged them into this new company. These were Prudential Assurance, Britannic Assurance, Liverpool Victoria, Pearl Assurance, and Refuge Assurance Company. The 1939 company followed the procedures of the Prudential, its largest component. The intention was to form a new company and then release its shares back on the market. However, other events in 1939 made shares in a life assurance company less attractive. The shares were finally sold in July 1991.

In 1965, Irish Life entered the UK market and competed against its former parent, initially under its own name. Later, it acquired The City of Westminster Assurance. Irish Life and The City of Westminster Assurance closed for new business in the UK in 1996. This 'closed book' was sold to Chesnara for £47.5 million on 5 May 2005.

The Prudential re-entered the Irish market under its own name, then sold their second Irish operation to the Insurance Corporation of Ireland (ICI). Allied Irish Banks took over Insurance Corporation of Ireland. Shortly afterwards, the general insurance company became insolvent. The Insurance Corporation of Ireland Life (ICI Life) was the Life Assurance subsidiary of the Insurance Corporation of Ireland. The Government of Ireland wrote off the debts of Insurance Corporation of Ireland and sold the ICI Life arm as a profitable going concern to Prudential. Prudential Life operated in Ireland until its acquisition by Irish Permanent Building Society. The life office then traded as Progressive Life. In 1999, Irish Life Assurance plc and the Irish Permanent Building Society merged to form the Irish Life and Permanent Group, and the operations of Progressive Life and Irish Life Assurance were merged.

Even though the government had to assist Allied Irish Banks following the debacle of Insurance Corporation of Ireland, they established another life assurance company, called 'Ark Life'.

Irish Life Assurance was never a fully state owned company. In 1939, the minister owned 18% of the shares in the company. In 1947, restructuring and purchase by Minister of Finance of shares held by British life assurance companies resulting in a government holding of 90.25%. In July 1991, these shares were released on the market.

Irish Life Assurance was a founding member of Irish Life & Permanent plc. In March 2012, during the Irish financial crisis, the profitable Irish Life Group was purchased from Permanent TSB by the Irish State for 1.2 billion as part of the recapitalisation of Permanent TSB bank. This ended the association between Irish Life Assurance and PTSB.

In July 2013, Great-West Lifeco of Canada completed its purchase of Irish Life from the Irish State.

Subsidiaries
Subsidiaries of Irish Life include 'Irish Progressive Services International Ltd' (IPSI), a solution provider working in the Life and Pensions industry. Founded in 1998, IPSI was part of the Irish Life and Permanent Group until the group was purchased by the Irish State in 2012, and sold to Great-West Lifeco in 2013. IPSI are a Third Party Administrator and supported Software provider to European Life Assurance Companies.

References

External links
 Irish Life Retail official website
 Irish Life Investment Managers official website
 Irish Life Corporate Business official website

Financial services companies established in 1939
Financial services companies based in Dublin (city)
Insurance companies of Ireland
1939 establishments in Ireland
2013 mergers and acquisitions
Power Corporation of Canada
Irish subsidiaries of foreign companies